The Austria national football team has represented Austria in international association football since 1902. Austria played its first international match on 12 October 1902, defeating neighbouring Hungary 5–0 in a friendly. The team is governed by the Austrian Football Association (ÖFB) and competes as a member of the Union of European Football Associations (UEFA), which encompasses the countries of Europe and Israel. As of November 2020, Austria has played a total of 791 international matches, winning 331, drawing 170 and losing 290. Austria have played Hungary most frequently, meeting the side 137 times. Of these, Austria have won 40, drawn 30 and lost 67. The Austria–Hungary football rivalry is the second-most played international fixture in football history, behind only the Argentina–Uruguay rivalry which has been played officially 194 times.

Andi Herzog is Austria's most capped player with 103 caps. He made his international debut on 6 April 1988 in a 2–2 draw with Greece and equalled Toni Polster's caps record on 17 April 2002 by winning his 95th cap. He surpassed Polster one month later in his next appearance and went on to finish his career with 103 caps, having become the only Austrian to win more than 100 caps. Polster remains Austria's highest goalscorer with 44 goals, including three hat-tricks and six braces.

Jan Studnicka, who scored a hat-trick in Austria's first international fixture, was the first player to amass 25 caps for the side. He achieved the tally in November 1917 but attained only three more caps for the national side during his career. Alexander Popovic set a new caps record in April 1921 by winning his 29th cap before Josef Brandstätter claimed the record a year later. Josef Blum equalled Brandstätter's record in 1929 but did not surpass him for nearly two years before becoming the new record holder when he won his next cap. He finished his career with 51 caps, becoming the first player to reach 50 appearances for the national side. Ernst Ocwirk held the caps record between 1954 and 1957 before Gerhard Hanappi became the record holder after his 62nd appearance. Hanappi's first 55 caps had been won in a consecutive spell of fixtures between November 1948 and May 1956. His final tally of 93 appearances stood for more than 40 years until Polster overtook the record during the group stage of the 1998 FIFA World Cup. Having equalled Hanappi's record in Austria's second group game against Chile, he won his 94th cap in his side's final group match with Italy. Polster appeared only once more for Austria after the tournament, retiring with 95 caps.

Studnicka also held the goalscoring record for the national side from the team's first match until 1929, although Ferdinand Swatosch did equal his tally of 18 in 1925. Johann Horvath overtook the pair with a brace against Italy. Horvath and Anton Schall competed for the record for several years as part of Austria's "Wunderteam"; Schall surpassed Horvath in 1933 before Horvath reclaimed the record the following year. Schall tied the new record a week later with his final international goal, but Horvath went on to score two more goals before retiring to finish his career with 29 goals. Horvath's record stood for 46 years until Hans Krankl scored his 30th international goal in November 1980, going on to finish his career with 34 goals. Krankl's total included six goals during a 9–0 victory over Malta in 1977, the most goals scored in a single international match by an Austrian player. The current record holder, Toni Polster, surpassed Krankl in 1996 and eventually ended his career with 44 international goals.

Players
Appearances and goals are composed of FIFA World Cup and UEFA European Championships, and each competition's required qualification matches, as well as UEFA Nations League matches and numerous international friendly tournaments and matches. Players are listed by number of caps. If the number of caps is equal, the players are then listed alphabetically. Statistics updated following match played on 18 November 2020.

See also
 List of Austria international footballers (1–24 caps)

Notes

References

 
Association football player non-biographical articles